ᾈ
Mirza Olang is a village in Sayyad District,  Sar-e Pol Province in Afghanistan. It is located about  out of Sar-e Pol city and is considered to be within its defensive belt. Most residents of Mirza Olang are Shia Hazaras. As of 2017, about 700 families live in Mirza Olang Village.

References

Populated places in Sar-e Pol Province